Adelante is a Cuban newspaper started in 1959. It is published in Spanish, with an online English edition. The newspaper is located in Camagüey.

References

External links
 Adelante online 
 Adelante online 

1959 establishments in Cuba
Mass media in Camagüey
Newspapers published in Cuba
Newspapers established in 1959
Spanish-language newspapers